= EphPod =

Freeware program

ephPod (pronounced eef-Pod) was a freeware program for Microsoft Windows that managed the interaction between Apple Computer's iPod digital audio player and the computer. It is no longer actively developed.

As of September 2025, the website is no longer online.
